Przegląd Elektrotechniczny (English: Electrotechnical Review) is a monthly  scientific journal covering electrical engineering and the oldest Polish journal in this field. It was established in 1919 by Wydawnictwo SIGMA-NOT. Initially it only covered electrical engineering in a narrow sense, but nowadays it also covers related topics, such as electronics, power systems, power electronics, traction, metrology, machines, transformers, and material engineering.

References

External links 
  

Multilingual journals
Publications established in 1919
Engineering journals
Monthly journals
Academic journals published in Poland